Philophuga is a genus of ground beetles in the family Carabidae. There are about five described species in Philophuga.

Species
These five species belong to the genus Philophuga:
 Philophuga amoena LeConte, 1848
 Philophuga brachinoides Bates, 1883
 Philophuga caerulea Casey, 1913
 Philophuga viridicollis (LeConte, 1846)
 Philophuga viridis (Dejean, 1831)

References

Further reading

 

Harpalinae
Articles created by Qbugbot